Pašilė is a small town in Lithuania. The population in the 2011 census was 160.

References

Towns in Šiauliai County
Towns in Lithuania